Borden's Ice Cream Shoppe is a historic ice cream parlor on Johnston Street in Lafayette, Louisiana, which was built in 1940 to sell Borden ice creams. In 1981, the then owner, lifelong Lafayette resident Flora Levy, died. Her will stipulated a large bequest to the University of Louisiana Lafayette's Foundation; the ice cream parlor was part of that bequest.  The Foundation held title to the building, and rented the space to the manager who continued to operate the business.  The building had been passed down from generation to generation in the Levy family; Flora had received it from her mother.

In May 2009 the Foundation sold the store to Lafayette Red's health club owner Red Lerille, who bought the property with the intention of keeping the local icon alive in Lafayette. Lerille plans to slightly renovate the building, adding a drive through window and outdoor seating. Lerille's daughter Kackie Lerille will manage the store. Lerille was quoted as saying that he is interested in mom-and-pop type businesses like the ice cream store. "I believe it is the American way, but it is dying fast. This location is actually the last Borden’s retail ice cream shop in the United States. It is a Lafayette tradition and my daughter and I fully intend to bring it back to its original state." Ella Mae Meaux—who had worked in the parlor for 48 years by the time it was sold to the Lerille Family—said, "Generations of family have come to Borden's for the old-fashioned ice cream parlor experience. This sale to the Lerilles ensures families will be able to continue with this experience for many years to come."

Business management 
Borden's had been run by General Manager Wayne Tucker. The business had rented the building from the ULL Foundation, with the rent being used to fund the annual Flora Levy Lecture Series at the University.  The proceeds from the sale of the building will also be placed in a trust to continue that lecture series.

References

External links
 

Borden (company)
Restaurants in Louisiana
Privately held companies based in Louisiana
Economy of Lafayette, Louisiana
Restaurants established in 1940
Buildings and structures in Lafayette, Louisiana
Tourist attractions in Lafayette Parish, Louisiana
1940 establishments in Louisiana